This article lists the living orders of the Viridiplantae, based primarily on the work of Ruggiero et al. 2015. Living order of Lycophytes and ferns are taken from Christenhusz et al. 2011b and Pteridophyte Phylogeny Group. Living orders of Gymnosperms are added from Christenhusz et al. 2011a while extinct orders are from Anderson, Anderson & Cleal 2007.

Division Prasinodermophyta

Class Prasinodermophyceae
 Order Prasinodermatales

Class Palmophyllophyceae
 Order Prasinococcales
 Order Palmophyllales

Division Chlorophyta

Subdivision Prasinophytina

Class Mamiellophyceae
 Order Monomastigales
 Order Dolichomastigales
 Order Mamiellales

Class Pyramimonadophyceae
 Order Pyramimonadales

Subdivision Chlorophytina

Class Nephroselmidophyceae
 Order Nephroselmidales

Class Picocystophyceae
 Order Picocystales
 Order ?Pseudoscourfieldiales

Class Chloropicophyceae
 Order Chloropicales

Class Pedinophyceae
 Order ?Scourfieldiales
 Order Marsupiomonadales
 Order Pedinomonadales

Class Chlorodendrophyceae
 Order Chlorodendrales

Class Trebouxiophyceae
 Order ?Phyllosiphonales
 Order Chlorellales
 Order Prasiolales
 Order Microthamniales
 Order Trebouxiales

Class Ulvophyceae
 Order Ignatiales
 Order Oltmannsiellopsidales
 Order Scotinosphaerales
 Order Ulotrichales
 Order Ulvales
 Order Trentepohliales
 Order Cladophorales
 Order Dasycladales
 Order Bryopsidales

Class Chlorophyceae
 Order Chaetopeltidales
 Order Chaetophorales
 Order Chlamydomonadales
 Order Chlorococcales
 Order Microsporales
 Order Oedogoniales
 Order Sphaeropleales
 Order Tetrasporales

Division Streptophyta

Subdivision Chlorokybophytina

Class Mesostigmatophyceae
 Order Mesostigmatales

Class Chlorokybophyceae
 Order Chlorokybales

Subdivision Klebsormidiophyinta

Class Klebsormidiophyceae
 Order Klebsormidiales

Subdivision Charophytina

Class Charophyceae
 Order †Sycidiales
 Order †Chovanellales
 Order †Moellerinales
 Order Charales (Stoenworts & musk grasses)

Subdivision Coleochaetophytina

Class Coleochaetophyceae
 Order Coleochaetales

Subdivision Zygnematophytina

Class Zygnematophyceae
 Order Spirogloeales
 Order Zygnematales
 Order Mesotaeniales
 Order Desmidiales

Subdivision Anthocerotophytina

Class Leiosporocerotopsida
 Order Leiosporocerotales

Class Anthocerotopsida
 Order Anthocerotales
 Order Notothyladales
 Order Phymatocerotales
 Order Dendrocerotales

Subdivision Marchantiophytina

Class Haplomitriopsida
 Order Treubiales 
 Order Calobryales

Class Marchantiopsida
 Subclass Blasiidae 
 Order Blasiales 
 Subclass Marchantiidae (Complex thalloid liverworts)
 Order Neohodgsoniales 
 Order Sphaerocarpales 
 Order Lunulariales (crescent-cup liverwort)
 Order Marchantiales

Class Jungermanniopsida
 Subclass Pelliidae 
 Order Pelliales 
 Order Pallaviciniales 
 Order Fossombroniales 
 Subclass Metzgeriidae 
 Order Pleuroziales
 Order Metzgeriales 
 Subclass Jungermanniidae (leafy liverworts)
 Order Porellales 
 Order Ptilidiales 
 Order Jungermanniales

Subdivision Bryophytina

Class Takakiopsida
 Order Takakiales

Class Sphagnopsida
 Order †Protosphagnales
 Order Ambuchananiales
 Order Sphagnales (Peat/bog mosses)

Class Andreaeobryopsida
 Order Andreaeobryales

Class Andreaeopsida
 Order Andreaeales (Granite/lantern mosses)

Class Oedipodiopsida
 Order Oedipodiales

Class Tetraphidopsida
 Order Tetraphidales

Class Polytrichopsida
 Order Polytrichales (Hair-cap mosses)

Class Bryopsida
 Subclass Buxbaumiidae
 Order Buxbaumiales
 Subclass Diphysciidae
 Order Diphysciales
 Subclass Gigaspermidae
 Order Gigaspermales
 Subclass Funariidae
 Order Disceliales
 Order Encalyptales
 Order Funariales
 Subclass Timmiidae
 Order Timmiales
 Subclass Dicranidae (Haplolepideous mosses)
 Order Archidiales
 Order Pseudoditrichales
 Order Catoscopiales
 Order Scouleriales
 Order Bryoxiphiales
 Order Grimmiales
 Order Pottiales
 Order Dicranales
 Subclass Bryidae (Diplolepideous-alternate mosses) 
 Superorder Bryanae
 Order Splachnales
 Order Hedwigiales
 Order Bartramiales
 Order Bryales
 Order Rhizogoniales
 Order Orthotrichales
 Order Orthodontiales
 Order Aulacomniales
 Superorder Hypnanae
 Order Hypnodendrales
 Order Ptychomniales
 Order Hypopterygiales
 Order Hookeriales
 Order Hypnales

Clade †Horneophytina

Class †Horneophytopsida
 Order †Horneophytales

Subdivision Tracheophytina

Class †Cooksoniopsida
 Order †Cooksoniales

Class †Rhyniopsida
 Order ?†Yarraviales
 Order ?†Taeniocradales
 Order †Rhyniales

Clade †Zosterophyllophyta
 Class †Barinophytopsida
 Order †Barinophytales
 Class †Zosterophyllopsida
 Order †Sawdoniales
 Order †Zosterophyllales

Class Lycopodiopsida
 Order †Drepanophycales
 Subclass †Asteroxylidae
 Order ?†Thursophytales
 Order †Asteroxylales
 Subclass Lycopodiidae
 Order Lycopodiales (Clubmosses, groundpines, groundcedars)
 Subclass †Prolepidodendridae
 Order †Protolepidodendrales
 Subclass Selaginellidae (Spikemosses; rose of Jericho; resurrection plant; Engels moss)
 Order Selaginellales
 Order †Lepidodendrales
 Order †Pleuromeiales
 Order Isoetales (Quillworts)

Class †Eophyllophytopsida
 Order †Eophyllophytales

Class †Trimerophytopsida
 Order †Trimerophytales

Clade Pteridophyta
 Order †Ibykales
 Class †Cladoxylopsida
 Order †Hyeniales
 Order †Iridopteridales
 Order †Steloxylales
 Order †Pseudosporochnales
 Order †Cladoxylales
 Class Polypodiopsida (Ferns)
 Order †Stauropteridales
 Subclass †Zygopterididae
 Order †Rhacophytales
 Order †Zygopteridales
 Subclass Equisetidae
 Order †Pseudoborniales
 Order †Sphenophyllales
 Order Equisetales (Horsetails; scouring-rushes)
 Subclass Ophioglossidae
 Order Psilotales (Whisk ferns) 
 Order Ophioglossales (Adder's tongues, moonworts)
 Subclass Marattiopsida
 Order Marattiales
 Subclass Polypodiidae
 Order †Urnatopteridales
 Order †Senftenbergiales
 Order †Botryopteridiales
 Order †Anachoropteridales
 Order Osmundales (Royal ferns)
 Order Hymenophyllales (Filmy ferns)
 Order Gleicheniales
 Order Schizaeales
 Order Salviniales
 Order Cyatheales
 Order Polypodiales (Cathetogyrates)

Class †Noeggerathiopsida
 Order †Discinitiales
 Order †Noeggerathiales
 Order †Tingiales

Class †Aneurophytopsida
 Order †Scougonophytales
 Order †Aneurophytales

Class †Archaeopteridopsida
 Order †Cecropsidales
 Order †Archaeopteridales

Incertae sedis
 Order †Protopityales
 Order †Stenokoleales

Clade Spermatophyta
 Order †Calamopityales
 Order †Callistophytales
 Order †Erdtmanithecales
 Order †Hlatimbiales
 Order †Umkomasiales
 Class †Arberiopsida
 Order †Aberiales
 Order †Dicranophyllales
 Class †Moresnetiopsida
 Order †Moresnetiales
 Order †Pullarithecales
 Order †Tetrastichiales
 Class †Lyginopteridopsida
 Order †Hexapterospermales
 Order †Lyginopteridales
 Class †Pachytestopsida
 Order †Codonospermales
 Order †Pachytestales
 Class †Peltaspermopsida
 Order †Peltaspermales
 Order †Sporophyllitales
 Order †Trichopityales
 Class †Phasmatocycadopsida
 Order †Gigantopteridales
 Order †Phasmatocycadales
 Class †Pentoxylopsida
 Order †Pentoxylales
 Class †Dictyopteridiopsida
 Order †Dictyopteridiales
 Order †Lidgettoniales
 Order †Rigbyales
 Class †Cycadeoideopsida
 Order †Fredlindiales
 Order †Cycadeoideales
 Class †Caytoniopsida
 Order †Caytoniales
 Class †Axelrodiopsida
 Order †Axelrodiales
 Class Pinopsida
 †Subclass Pityidae
 †Order Pityales
 Subclass Cycadidae
 Order ?†Noeggerathiopsidales
 Order †Podozamitales
 Order Cycadales (Cycads) 
 Subclass Ginkgoidae
 Order †Hamshawviales
 Order †Vladimariales
 Order †Matatiellales
 Order †Petriellales
 Order †Czekanowskiales
 Order Ginkgoales
 Subclass Pinidae
 Order †Cordaitales
 Order †Dordrechtitales
 Order †Vojnovskyales
 Order †Buriadiales
 Order †Ferugliocladales
 Order †Ullmanniales
 Order †Walchiales
 Order †Voltziales
 Order †Bernettiales
 Order †Eoanthales
 Order †Fraxinopsiales
 Order Gnetales (incl. Ephedrales & Welwitschiales)
 Order Pinales (Pines and allies)
 Order Araucariales
 Order Cupressales (Cypresses and allies)
 Class Magnoliopsida
 Subclass †Archaemagnoliidae
 Order †Archaefructales
 Superorder Amborellanae
 Order Amborellales
 Subclass Nymphaeidae
 Order Nymphaeales
 Subclass Illiciidae
 Order Austrobaileyales
 Subclass Chloranthidae
 Order Chloranthales
 Subclass Magnoliidae
 Order Canellales
 Order Piperales
 Order Laurales
 Order Magnoliales
 Subclass Liliidae
 Superorder Acoranae
 Order Acorales
 Superorder Alismatanae
 Order Alismatales
 Superorder Petrosavianae
 Order Petrosaviales
 Superorder Pandananae
 Order Dioscoreales
 Order Pandanales
 Superorder Lilianae
 Order Liliales
 Superorder Orchidanae
 Order Asparagales
 Superorder Commelinids 
 Order Arecales
 Order Commelinales
 Order Zingiberales
 Order Poales
 Subclass Ceratophyllidae
 Order Ceratophyllales
 Clade Eudicots
 Order ?†Sarbaicarpales
 Subclass Ranunculidae
 Order Ranunculales
 Subclass Nelumbonidae
 Order Proteales
 Subclass Trochodendridae
 Order Trochodendrales
 Superorder Buxanae
 Order Buxales
 Superorder Myrothamnanae
 Order Gunnerales
 Clade Pentapetalae
 Subclass Dilleniidae
 Order Dilleniales
 Subclass Asteridae
 Superorder Berberidopsidanae
 Order Berberidopsidales
 Superorder Santalanae
 Order Santalales
 Superorder Caryophyllanae
 Order Caryophyllales
 Superorder Cornanae
 Order Cornales
 Superorder Ericanae
 Order Ericales
 Superorder Asteranae
 Order Apiales
 Order Aquifoliales
 Order Asterales
 Order Bruniales
 Order Dipsacales
 Order Escalloniales
 Order Paracryphiales
 Superorder Lamianae
 Order Boraginales
 Order Garryales
 Order Gentianales
 Order Icacinales
 Order Lamiales
 Order Metteniusales
 Order Solanales
 Order Vahliales
 Subclass Rosidae'''
 Superorder Saxifraganae
 Order Saxifragales 
 Superorder Vitanae
 Order Vitales
 Superorder Rosanae  
 Order Zygophyllales
 Order Celastrales
 Order Malpighiales
 Order Oxalidales
 Order Fabales
 Order Cucurbitales
 Order Fagales
 Order Rosales
 Superorder Myrtanae
 Order Geraniales
 Order Myrtales
 Order Crossosomatales
 Order Picramniales
 Order Sapindales
 Order Huerteales
 Order Malvales
 Order Brassicales

References

 
Taxonomic lists (orders)
Biology-related lists
Gardening lists
Botanical nomenclature
Orders